Beni Chebana is a town and commune in Sétif Province in north-eastern Algeria.

Location
It is 250 km from Algiers and 90 km from Sétif.

Its territory covers 1.060 km².

References

Communes of Sétif Province